The Virginia Sterilization Act of 1924 was a U.S. state law in Virginia for the sterilization of institutionalized persons "afflicted with hereditary forms of insanity that are recurrent, idiocy, imbecility, feeble-mindedness or epilepsy”. It greatly influenced the development of eugenics in the twentieth century. The act was based on model legislation written by Harry H. Laughlin and challenged by a case that led to the United States Supreme Court decision of Buck v. Bell.  The Supreme Court upheld the law as constitutional and it became a model law for sterilization laws in other states. Justice Holmes wrote that a patient may be sterilized "on complying with the very careful provisions by which the act protects the patients from possible abuse." Between 1924 and 1979, Virginia sterilized over 7,000 individuals under the act. The act was never declared unconstitutional; however, in 2001, the Virginia General Assembly passed a joint resolution apologizing for the misuse of "a respectable, 'scientific' veneer to cover activities of those who held blatantly racist views." In 2015, the Assembly agreed to compensate individuals sterilized under the act.

Historical background

Laughlin's Model Eugenical Sterilization Law

During the early 20th century, Harry H. Laughlin, director of the Eugenics Record Office at Cold Spring Harbor, New York, became concerned that states were not enforcing their eugenics laws.  In 1922, he published his book, Eugenical Sterilization in the United States, which included a "MODEL EUGENICAL STERILIZATION LAW" in Chapter XV.

By 1924, 15 states had enacted similar legislation; however, unlike Virginia, many or most or all of those states failed to rigidly enforce their laws requiring specific qualities in all persons seeking to marry.  Forced sterilization, however, was much more common. By 1956, twenty-four states had laws providing for involuntary sterilization on their books. These states collectively reported having forcibly sterilized 59,000 people over the preceding 50 years.

Virginia implemented Laughlin's "Model Eugenical Sterilization Law" with little modification two years after it was published.

Text from the 1924 Act

Sterilization law after 1988
An act, passed by the General Assembly of Virginia in 1988 and amended in 2013, provides the procedural requirements necessary for a physician to lawfully sterilize a patient capable of giving informed consent and incapable of giving informed consent.  A physician may perform a sterilization procedure on a patient if the patient is capable of giving informed consent, the patient consents to the procedure in writing, and the physician explains the consequences of the procedure and alternative methods of contraception.  A court may authorize a physician to perform a sterilization on a mentally incompetent adult or child after the procedural requirements are met and the court finds with clear and convincing evidence the patient is or is likely to engage sexual activity, no other contraceptive is reasonably available, the patient's mental disability renders the patient permanently unable to care for a child, and the procedure conforms with medical standards.

Apology and compensation

Legislative history
In February 2001, the Virginia General Assembly passed a joint resolution, introduced by Mitchell Van Yahres, expressing regret for Virginia's experience with eugenics.  In the 2002 session, Van Yahres introduced a joint resolution honoring the memory of Carrie Buck.  This joint resolution was passed by the House and Senate in February 2002. In the same year, Bob Marshall, introduced a joint resolution referencing the 2001 eugenics resolution and calling for the establishment of a subcommittee to study issues related to stem cell research; however, this resolution did not pass the Rules committee. In 2013 and 2014, Marshall introduced the Justice for Victims of Sterilization Act to give compensation for up to $50,000 per person; however, the bill did not get past the Appropriations committee in either year. In 2015, Patrick A. Hope reintroduced the Justice for Victims of Sterilization Act, and although the Act did not get past the Appropriations committee, an amendment was added to the budget bill to give compensation of up to $25,000 per person who was "involuntarily sterilized pursuant to the Virginia Eugenical Sterilization Act."

Eligibility for compensation
The legislature authorized compensation of up to $25,000 per claim to provide compensation for individuals sterilized "pursuant to the Virginia Eugenical Sterilization Act and who were living as of February 1, 2015."  If the person died on or after February 1, 2015, a claim may be submitted by the estate or personal representative of the person who died.

See also
Racial Integrity Act of 1924
Poe v. Lynchburg Training School & Hospital
Law for the Prevention of Hereditarily Diseased Offspring

References

History of racism in Virginia
Eugenics in the United States
Mental health law in the United States
Reproductive rights in the United States
Virginia law